The Abruzzese or Podolica abruzzese di montagna is an extinct breed of domestic cattle from the Abruzzo region of southern Italy. It belonged to the Podolic group of cattle, and was a dual-purpose breed, kept both for meat and for draught use. The breed was listed as extinct by the FAO in 2007.

References

Extinct cattle breeds